Larisa Ocvirk (born May 26, 1997) is a Slovenian basketball player for ŽKK Celje and the Slovenian national team.

She participated at the EuroBasket Women 2017.

References

1997 births
Living people
Slovenian women's basketball players
Sportspeople from Celje
Small forwards